The City of Mirrors is a 2016 horror novel by Justin Cronin and is the final novel in The Passage trilogy, following the novel The Twelve. The City of Mirrors was released for publication on May 24, 2016 by Ballantine Books.

The film rights to the three novels were acquired in 2007 for adaptation into a film trilogy, but after 12 years of development and planning, it has been changed to a television series, premiering in January 2019.

The City of Mirrors picks up where The Twelve left off, following the destruction of the Twelve and their viral followers, and explores the background of Subject Zero, the first human to be changed in the early 21st century. It delves into lengthy flashbacks, and also jumps 900 years into the future to reveal humanity's fate.

Plot
Alicia Donadio's child, the result of her rape in The Twelve, is stillborn. She forces herself out of her stupor and decides to hunt down Zero.

Michael Fisher sails around the continent looking for the storied mines that were placed to keep the viral contamination at bay.  He learns the virus has spread to the rest of the world, and realizes that the mines do not exist, and neither does the rest of the world; human civilization was completely wiped out by a mutated version of the virus. He finds an ocean liner beached in the Gulf of Mexico, and determines to fix it and sail to a safe island to save some portion of humanity. Lucius Greer has been keeping Amy and Carter alive in the cargo hold of their own ship by bringing them blood to feed on. Amy has no control over herself as a viral while Carter seems to be able to control his impulses.

Peter Jaxon is raising his nephew Caleb in Kerrvile, the capital of the Republic of Texas. In his dreams, he lives with a human Amy, though he has not actually seen her in years.  He accepts a request from the newly elected president of the Republic of Texas to join her administration, leading an initiative to open the town's security gates, since the virals have not been seen for years, allowing humanity to branch out.

Alicia finds Zero in New York City, but learns he is her infector, thus she cannot kill him. He befriends her and reveals he was originally Tim Fanning, who had a crush on Jonas Lear's girlfriend Liz during college. Later in life, when Jonas' science pulled him away from home in search of a cure for Liz's cancer, Liz and Tim had a brief tryst, though she turned down his request to stay with him. After Liz died, Tim eventually joined Jonas in his research to find a solution to humanity's challenge (resulting in Amy).  The rest of his story is chronicled in the beginning of The Passage where Tim becomes the only one to survive infection, and thus becomes the first viral; Subject Zero.  He reveals how almost drowning was what reverted him to human form, but retains everything else bestowed on him by the virus. 

Michael has worked for twenty years to rebuild the ship. Peter is now President of Texas, but finds that the human colonies have been able to spread so far that this may be the last presidency.

Alicia, having lived with Zero for a few years, learns of his plan to kill the remaining humans in his quest to destroy Amy. Alicia leaves to warn her friends, while Zero sends his Many (infected virals) towards Texas in a plan to draw Amy out of hiding.

The Many kill/convert the outer colonies, finally converging on Kerrville. Amy is restored to human form by Peter with the help of  Alicia's knowledge of water. Carter transfers his Many over to Amy to assist in defending Kerrville. Zero's army prevails, leaving only 700 human survivors when the morning sun drives the virals off. Peter and Michael lead the people to the ship, arriving on the coast at dusk. Zero's Many attack, but Carter sacrifices his life to help Amy and the rest achieve the safety of the ship. 

Virals Alicia and Amy are joined by Peter and Michael, leaving the ship to find and kill Zero in order to end the plague. Peter is bitten by Zero, but his love for Amy prevents him from killing her at Zero's command. Zero is killed by Amy, who saves Peter with her own blood before he is destroyed along with the rest of Zero's Many. A near drowning has removed all traces of the virus from Alicia, who then decides to jump to her death. Michael takes a ship to England. Virals Amy and Peter live together, until he dies of old age after a couple of hundred years.

The Kerrville survivors sail to the safe island, becoming the cradle for humanity. After 1000 years (Which is said to be the minimum required time for the virals to die off on their own in case they would not be stopped), their descendants return to North America. They find an ancient Amy, who tells them her story.

Characters

References

External links
 Official book site

2010s horror novels
2016 American novels
American horror novels
Ballantine Books books